Tommy Bennett (born February 19, 1973 in Las Vegas, Nevada) is a former American football safety in the National Football League.

Bennett graduated from Samuel F. B. Morse High School in 1991, where he was a member of the 1990 Morse Tigers, voted by the San Diego Union-Tribune as the best high school football team in the history of San Diego County at the time of the poll. Bennett played college football at UCLA, then signed with the Arizona Cardinals as an undrafted free agent for the 1995 NFL season. Bennett played for the Cardinals for six years, then spent one year with the Detroit Lions. He presently resides in the Phoenix area.

Bennett was arrested for possession of cocaine and was suspended by the NFL for violating no-steroid use policies.

Bennet’s most famous play was an Interception thrown by Troy Aikman in the 1998 NFC Wild Card game against the Dallas Cowboys sealing the Cardinals first playoff win since 1947.

References

External links
NFL player page
Stats

1973 births
American football safeties
Arizona Cardinals players
Detroit Lions players
Living people
Sportspeople from Las Vegas
UCLA Bruins football players